Boranja (Serbian Cyrillic: Борања) is a mountain in western Serbia, above the Drina river, between towns of Krupanj and Mali Zvornik.

References

External links
 Gljivarski tereni: Boranja 

Mountains of Serbia